Ust-Ilimsk Airport  is a large airport in Irkutsk Oblast, Russia located 17 km northwest of Ust-Ilimsk.  It was a major regional facility capable of handling all sizes of airliners.  The airport has a very large concrete apron with 500 x 200 M tarmac.

The airport was closed in 2001 due to bankruptcy, but reopened in 2013 for flights to Irkutsk.  Because of the smaller aircraft needed for the short length of flight to that destination, the operational runway area was reduced to 1000 metres.  On the airport location a module passenger building with security block and flight control center have been installed to enable ground operations which were not possible in the earlier-destroyed buildings.

History

Airport  started off in 1980.
 1980 - First flight Ust-Ilimsk - Irkutsk with Yakovlev 40.
 1988 - First Tupolev 154 landed.
 1989. = Hotel was built.
 1993 - New passenger building started off
 1994 - First Boeing 757-200 landed in the airport location
 1995 - First in Syberia passenger boarding bridges appeared 
 1997 - Runway was increased to 3100 metres by Yugoslavia specialists. 
 2001 - Last passenger flight to Irkutsk city.
 2001 - Last cargo flight

In 2002 airport was closed after its debts reached 40 million rubles. In 2005 airport went into bankruptcy. All airport infrastructure was destroyed. Rebuilding will require much money. Part of the property was sold during bankruptcy, and part was given to Ust-Ilimsk city. Security was absent since 2002, all other property was stolen.

Reanimation of airport was discussed a lot of times by Moscow companies, Lufthansa. But the companies declined. 
 2013 - New company State enterprise "Runaway" was officially registered [original document - МУП «Посадочная площадка (Аэропорт) города Усть-Илимска»]
 2013 - The local Parliament of Ust-Ilimsk declared the airport infrastructure as city property. [originally - № 57/392 "О принятии недвижимого имущества из муниципальной собственности муниципального образования «Усть-Илимский район» в муниципальную собственность муниципального образования «город Усть-Илимск» объекты аэропорта были приняты в собственность города.]

On August 13, 2013 flights to Irkutsk resumed and the airport's eleven-year dormancy ended.

Airlines and destinations

External links

References 

Airports built in the Soviet Union
Airports in Irkutsk Oblast